The Honda BR-V is an automobile manufactured by Honda since 2016 and mainly sold for emerging markets. It is a subcompact crossover SUV which offers three-row seating as standard or as an option. While being dimensionally bigger, the BR-V is positioned below the more advanced international market HR-V. The first-generation model shares its platform with the second-generation Mobilio, which itself based on the lengthened Brio platform. The second-generation model is built on a separate platform from the Mobilio (shared with the second-generation Amaze and the WR-V instead).

Developed by Honda R&D Asia Pacific in Thailand, the BR-V has been manufactured and assembled in several Asian countries, including Indonesia, Thailand, the Philippines, Malaysia, India, and Pakistan, and is also sold in Brunei, Mexico, and South Africa.

According to Honda, the name "BR-V" stands for "Bold Roundabout Vehicle".



First generation (DG1/2; 2016) 

On 20 August 2015, the first-generation BR-V prototype was unveiled at the 23rd Gaikindo Indonesia International Auto Show. It is the third model that was developed by Honda R&D Asia Pacific in Thailand after the Amaze and Mobilio (both also derived from the Brio).

According to Tomoki Uchida, the director of Honda Prospect Motor in Indonesia at the time, the BR-V would "serve as an answer to rising customer demands and needs for an affordable SUV that rides high, has a sleek design and is capable to load 7 passengers at one trip". As BR-V is targeted particularly for the Asian market, mass production took place at several plants with different commencement date.

Markets

India  
The first-generation BR-V was launched in India in an official event in Kolkata on 5 May 2016. Four trim levels were available: E, S, V and VX. All trim are available with either a petrol or diesel engine paired with a manual transmission. Only the petrol-powered V trim can be had with a continuous variable transmission. It was discontinued in 2020 due to declining sales and implementation of BS6 emission standards from April 2020.

Indonesia 
The first-generation BR-V went on sale in Indonesia on 23 January 2016 and is available in 3 trim levels, which are S, E, and E Prestige (renamed to Prestige in the facelifted model). The hill-start assist and vehicle stability assist is available in CVT option.

The BR-V became Honda's second best-selling automobile model in Indonesia for 2016.

Malaysia 
The first-generation BR-V was launched in Malaysia on 5 January 2017. The Malaysian version comes with added NVH reduction features compared to those sold in neighboring countries. By early March 2017, bookings up to 8,500 units were received for the Honda BR-V in Malaysia, making it one of the top selling cars for Honda in Malaysia and resulting in an extended waiting time for the car. Almost 12,000 units of BR-V were sold within the first six months after launch. All variant/trim come standard with Electric Power Steering (EPS), Hill Start Assist (HSA), Anti-lock Braking System (ABS), Vehicle Stability Assist (VSA), Isofix and reverse camera with parking sensors.

In Malaysia, the BR-V is offered in E, V and SE (Special Edition) trim levels and powered by 1.5L SOHC i-VTEC engine paired with Continuous Variable Transmission (CVT).

Pakistan 
The first-generation BR-V was opened for booking in Pakistan in February 2017 and officially launched on 21 April 2017.

Honda Atlas offered the vehicle in three different variants/trim levels:
 i-VTEC MT (manual transmission)
 i-VTEC (automatic transmission)
 i-VTEC S (automatic transmission)

The i-VTEC MT variant was launched on 1 April 2018.

Philippines 
The first-generation BR-V was previewed at the 2016 Philippine International Motor Show. It is available in 2 trim levels: 1.5 S CVT and 1.5 V Navi CVT.

It went on sale on 10 December 2016 at all Honda dealerships across the country.

South Africa 
The first-generation BR-V was launched into the South African market in October 2016 with either manual transmission or CVT options with three trim levels. South African models received paddle shifters on the CVT models. The lineup doesn't include EBD on any models. Both daytime running lamps and reverse parking sensors are absent and neither are offered as an optional factory option.

Thailand 
Initially previewed at the 2015 Thailand International Motor Expo, the first-generation BR-V was launched in Thailand on the 28 January 2016 with two variants available: V and SV. The V only came with two rows of seats allowing for a seating capacity of 5 while the SV variant came with three rows of seats allowing for a seating capacity of 7.

Facelift 
The BR-V received a facelift that includes redesigned front and rear fascia. This facelift was first launched at the 27th Indonesia International Motor Show on 25 April 2019.

On 5 November 2019, for the Mexican market, this facelift entered the market just after being sold for a year.

Engines 

Second generation (DG3; 2021) 

The second-generation BR-V was unveiled in Indonesia on 21 September 2021. It was previewed as a near-production concept model, called the "N7X Concept", which was revealed on 3 May 2021. Development was led by Large Project Leader Parinya Tangwiengwang of Honda R&D Asia Pacific. Its design is mostly retained from the N7X Concept with minimum changes, while its dashboard design is nearly identical to the second-generation Amaze and the WR-V released later.

The second-generation BR-V uses the 1.5-litre L15ZF DOHC i-VTEC four-cylinder engine that produces  at 6,600 rpm along with the continuously variable transmission that is shared with the seventh-generation City, with slight adjustments in tuning.

The second-generation BR-V went on production in Indonesia on 13 December 2021 with a claimed localisation level of 80%. Indonesian sales commenced on 8 January 2022. Exports from the country also commenced on 16 March 2022 to around 30 countries throughout Africa and South America.

Markets

Indonesia 
In Indonesia, the second-generation BR-V is offered in S, E and Prestige grade levels. Honda Sensing active safety system along with the LaneWatch camera system is available as an option for the Prestige trim.

Thailand 
In Thailand, the second-generation BR-V was announced on 27 July 2022. Imported from Indonesia, it is offered in E and EL grades. Honda Sensing is standard in every trim.

Philippines 
The second generation BR-V was released in the Philippines on 21 November 2022. It is offered in 3 grades; S (manual and CVT), V (CVT only) and the top-grade VX (CVT only), all with the 1.5-litre VTEC engine. Honda Sensing is standard for the VX grade.

Safety

Sales

References

External links 

  (Indonesia)

BR-V
Cars introduced in 2016
2020s cars
Mini sport utility vehicles
Crossover sport utility vehicles
Front-wheel-drive vehicles
Vehicles with CVT transmission